Cashew pie is a pie prepared with cashews as a primary ingredient. Whole or chopped cashews may be used, or both. It may be prepared with a sweet filling base prepared with corn syrup, sugar and eggs, similar to how pecan pie filling is prepared. It may be prepared using chocolate and fruits such as raspberry as an ingredient, and may be served topped with whipped cream or caramel. It may be served hot.

See also

 Chestnut pie
 List of pies, tarts and flans
 Peanut pie
 Walnut pie

References 

American pies
Cashew dishes
Sweet pies